Chang La is a high mountain pass in Ladakh at an elevation of  in the Ladakh Range between Leh and the Shyok River valley. The Chang La, on Leh to Pangong Lake road, lies on the Leh-Karu-Sakti-Zingral-Chang La-Durbuk-Tangtse-Pangong Lake motorable road. Karu, which lies on Leh-Manali NH-3, connects Chang La and Pangong Lake to Leh and the rest of India. In September 2021, BRO opened another alternate motorable asphalt road between Zingral and Tangtse via Ke La pass and Taruk (also spelled Tharuk).

Chang La is approached from Zingral village by a steeply climbing asphalt road which requires a careful drive. The stretch of 10–15 km road on either side of Chang la becomes loose dirt and slush after the winter and requires regular maintenance. During the summer months specifically the tourist season, small streams appear across the road, making the climb a challenge for the bikers. The descent from Chang La towards Tangtse or Darbuk is again very steep. As per the medics, it is advisable to not stay at the top for more than 20-25 mins as it could be detrimental to health owing to its high altitude which could cause the altitude sickness.

Etymology 

Chang La literally means "Northern Pass"  (Chang = north, La = Pass).

Geography 

The Changla Pass is the main gateway for the Nubra region. The small town of Tangste is one of the nearest settlement. Zingral is the nearest habitation.

DRDO research station 

The world's highest research station, established by the Defence Research and Development Organisation is functional in Chang La at a height of 17,664 ft.

Gallery

See also 

 India-China Border Roads
 Transport and tourism in Ladakh
 List of mountain passes of India
 List of mountains in India

References

External links
 Video clip of road on Chang La

Mountain passes of Ladakh
Mountain passes of the Himalayas